Proliferating epidermoid cysts are a cutaneous condition characterized by tumors that have deep invasion, and are associated with anaplasia and a high mitotic rate.

See also 
 List of cutaneous conditions

References 

 
Epidermal nevi, neoplasms, and cysts